The 1982 Individual Long Track World Championship was the 12th edition of the FIM speedway Individual Long Track World Championship. The event was held on 19 September 1982 at the Korskro Motor Centre in Esbjerg in Denmark.

The world title was won by Karl Maier of West Germany for the second time.

Final Classification 

 E = eliminated (no further ride)
 f = fell
 ef = engine failure
 x = excluded

References 

1982
Speedway competitions in Denmark
Motor
Motor